The 1986–87 Central Michigan Chippewas men's basketball team represented Central Michigan University as a member of the Mid-American Conference during the 1986–87 NCAA Division I men's basketball season. The team was led by head coach Charlie Coles and played their home games at the Daniel P. Rose Center. After finishing atop the MAC regular season standings, the Chippewas won the MAC tournament to earn an automatic bid to the NCAA tournament as No. 13 seed in the West region. Central Michigan lost to No. 4 seed UCLA in the opening round. The team finished with a record of 22–8 (14–2 MAC).

Roster

Schedule and results

|-
!colspan=9 style=| Non-Conference Regular Season

|-
!colspan=9 style=| MAC Regular Season

|-
!colspan=9 style=| MAC Tournament

|-
!colspan=9 style=| NCAA Tournament

References

Central Michigan
Central Michigan Chippewas men's basketball seasons
Central Michigan
Central Michigan Chippewas men's basketball
Central Michigan Chippewas men's basketball